The Sumo World Championships is an amateur sumo competition organized by the International Sumo Federation. The men's competition started in 1992 and the women's competition started in 2001, with both competitions having been held together. The competitions are generally held every year, although the 2009 and 2011 events were cancelled due to the 2009 flu pandemic and political unrest over the Arab Spring respectively. The 24th edition, originally scheduled to take place in Russia in 2022, will now be held in Tokyo in late 2023.

Weight classes

1992–2018

 Age restrictions of 13–18 years old apply

2019–present

 Age restrictions of 13–18 years old apply

Men's Individual competition
The wrestlers who subsequently entered professional sumo (or were former professionals) also have their ring name or shikona listed.

Men's Team competition

Women's Individual competition

Women's Team competition

See also
Sumo at the World Games
International Sumo Federation

Notes

Sumo
Sumo competitions